2008 in swimming documents the highlights of competitive international swimming during 2008.

Major events

World
9–13 April: 2008 FINA World Swimming Championships (25 m) in Manchester, United Kingdom
3–8 May: 2008 FINA World Open Water Swimming Championships in Seville, Spain
8–13 July: 2008 FINA Youth World Swimming Championships in Monterrey, Mexico 
9–17 August: Swimming at the 2008 Summer Olympics in Beijing, China
20–21 August: 10 km marathon swimming at the 2008 Summer Olympics in Beijing, China
7–15 September: Swimming at the 2008 Summer Paralympics in Beijing, China
25–26 October: Marathon swimming at the 2008 Asian Beach Games in Bali, Indonesia
2008 FINA Swimming World Cup
10–12 October: Belo Horizonte, Brazil
17–18 October: Durban, South Africa
25–26 October: Sydney, Australia
1–2 November: Singapore
8–9 November: Moscow, Russia
11–12 November: Stockholm, Sweden
15–16 November: Berlin, Germany

Regional
30 July – 3 August 2008 European Junior Swimming Championships in Belgrade, Serbia
1–7 December: 2008 African Swimming Championships in Johannesburg, South Africa
11–14 December: European Short Course Swimming Championships 2008 in Rijeka, Croatia

Other events

National championships
Long course

Short course

Other major meets

 
Swimming by year